WSM-FM (95.5 MHz) is a radio station in Nashville, Tennessee. It broadcasts a country music format, with an emphasis on recordings released since the 1990s.

From 1968 to 2008, WSM-FM was the sister of the clear-channel WSM. The station is now owned by Cumulus Media and no longer has any organizational relation to the AM.  A transmitter site is co-located with the station's former television partner WSMV in West Nashville, and its studios are located in Nashville's Music Row district.

History

WSM-FM began broadcasting on 1 November 1962 as WLWM, owned by C. Webber Parrish (d/b/a Barlane Broadcasting Corporation), a local Nashville businessman.

In late 1967 ownership of the station was transferred to WSM, Inc., a subsidiary of The National Life and Accident Insurance Company, owners of WSM (AM), and the next year the station's call letters were changed to WSM-FM. This marked the return of the WSM-FM call sign after an absence of 17 years. In 1941, National Life had established the first fully licensed commercial FM station in the United States. Initially known as W47NV. This original WSM-FM was shut down in 1951 and its license returned to the FCC.

After a short period of simulcasting the AM station, beginning in 1969 WSM-FM returned to the easy listening format previously aired by WLWM.

"SM95", 1976–1983

In 1976, National Life changed WSM-FM (despite some management misgivings) to a soft-rock playlist that was very broad by today's standards; during those years, the station adopted the branding "SM95".

In demographics, the station went after an audience of people in their twenties and thirties who, obviously enough, wanted something more musically interesting than easy listening but disliked the harder and louder rock that was becoming popular among teenagers then. SM95 was one of the few outlets in the nation for up-and-coming singer-songwriters to get airplay without having a smash record elsewhere; some of the artists were in fact Nashville-based, reflecting the growth in non-country artists recording there. One might consider the moderately eclectic format a forerunner of the "Adult album alternative" playlists that achieved some success years later, beginning in the 1990s.

Former SM95 disc jockey Nick Archer operated a Live 365 internet-only streaming re-creation of the station's format (featuring the original station IDs and jingles) from November 2001 until February 2008, almost as long as the original broadcast station's run. Archer attempted it again in 2014, mixing in newer music, but it was not as successful.

Country music format, 1983–present

The ratings of SM95 began to decline—and thus its advertiser appeal—as its audience began aging in the early 1980s. By 1983, some four years after the conversion of the AM to a full-time country format, management decided to bring the FM in line with the AM, and flipped the format to country (with an emphasis on current hits, instead of the AM's emphasis on oldies).

After the sale of WSM, Inc. to Gaylord Broadcasting, the new owner moved the studios of both AM and FM to an outlying building at the Opryland Hotel complex at that time, from their 1970s home on Knob Road in west Nashville, where former sister TV station WSMV-TV still operates today. In the 1990s, WSM-FM operated from a studio inside the now-defunct Opryland USA theme park, which visitors could view through a glass window. Following the theme park's demolition, the station moved into a renovated guestroom at Gaylord Opryland Resort & Convention Center. The station had an auxiliary studio at the Wildhorse Saloon downtown, and later at Opry Mills.

For most of the 1980s and 1990s, 95.5 FM was a highly competitive, yet usually No. 2 (behind rival WSIX-FM), country station. For much of the 1980s and 1990s, the station was branded as "Nashville 95". However, upon the arrival of a fourth country station in the market in 1999 (WKDF, which had played rock music since the 1970s), WSM-FM fell to a distant third place, and sometimes fell to fourth behind then-sister WSM.

In 2001, WSM-FM attempted to differentiate itself from the other FM country outlets by shifting to a format consisting mostly of live performances provided by the artists' labels or those within the WSM archives (such as Opry performances and in-studio appearances). The station was known during this era as "Live 95", and also simulcast the Opry live every Friday and Saturday night. After abandoning this approach to return to a traditional approach to programming, and until the end of the Gaylord era, the station was branded "Back to Back Country 95.5 WSM-FM".

In 2003, WSM-FM (along with sister news/talk/sports station WWTN) was sold to Cumulus Media. The lineup at the time consisted of Katie and Carp in the mornings, Frank Series in middays, David Hughes in afternoons (best known for his "Church day" antics on Wednesdays) and Su-Anna in evenings. The station continued to broadcast from a first-floor hotel room in the Gaylord hotel until mid-2004 under the direction of program director Lee Logan. The studios and offices were eventually moved to Cumulus' existing property on Music Circle East, in Nashville's Music Row district.

In September 2004, with new program director Jon Sebastian, the station adopted a revised country format (branded as "95.5 The Wolf") that included some Southern rock music. After some initial ratings success, the station fell to a consistent third place behind WKDF and WSIX, and a more traditional country approach was once again employed. New program director Buddy Van Aresdale took the helm. The ratings steadily increased before Van Aresdale left for greener pastures. Another program director, Kevin King, took charge, this time with "consultant" Jan Jeffries, a long-time friend of the Dickey family.

On 16 December 2010, while rival station WSIX-FM was in the midst of a reboot and stunting with nonstop Christmas music, WSM-FM itself relaunched, dropping "The Wolf" moniker. The station returned to using its heritage call letters, while offering a mainstream country playlist that included the top country hits of the day, as well as a heavy reliance on familiar hits dating back to the early 1990s.

In 2012, due to the bankruptcy of Citadel Broadcasting and subsequent acquisition by Cumulus, WSM-FM and rival WKDF became sister stations, operating from the same building, yet still competing for the same mainstream country audience. Their operations were streamlined in January 2014 with the hiring of a common program director. WKDF adopted Cumulus' "Nash FM" moniker and format in February 2014, six months ahead of a similar change to come on WSM-FM.

On 15 August 2014, the station rebranded as "95.5 Nash Icon", thus serving as the nominal flagship station of Cumulus' new Nash Icon brand, a spin-off of Nash FM that focuses on more familiar traditional country titles ranging back to the 1980s, as well as a focus on new music by more traditional-sounding artists. The format minimizes the amount of talking by the air personalities and places a heavier emphasis on the variety and amount of music. The Nash Icon radio format is a by-product of a joint venture between Cumulus and Big Machine Records to launch and operate the Nash Icon Records label.

In January 2015, WSM-FM became syndicated nationally on Westwood One's offering of the Nash Icon format, which is distributed to several Cumulus Nash Icon-branded stations, as well as some non-Cumulus-owned subscribing stations. The personalities provide a generic non-live or local presence on the radio dial.

Grand Ole Opry schedule conflicts
In past years, when WSM had the rights to broadcast Vanderbilt Commodore football and basketball games and Atlanta Braves baseball, it had WSM-FM air them whenever they took place on Friday or Saturday nights, in order not to preempt the live Grand Ole Opry shows on AM 650. Until the end of the 2003–08 Cumulus operating agreement, WSM-FM also aired NASCAR broadcasts under the same circumstances.

See also
List of oldest radio stations

References

External links
Cumulus press release on WSM-FM acquisition

FCC History Cards for WSM-FM (covering WLWM / WSM-FM from 1962 to 1980)

SM-FM
Country radio stations in the United States
Radio stations established in 1962
Cumulus Media radio stations